Beeton is a small community located in southern Simcoe County, Ontario, Canada between Tottenham and Alliston; all three were amalgamated in 1991 into the single Town of New Tecumseth.  Beeton was named for a local apiary.  Formerly known as Clarksville for Robert Clark, an early settler;  the name changed to Beeton in 1878.

Demographics
Population: 3,891 (2016 Census)
Location: Ontario, Canada
Postal code: L0G 1A0
Area code: +1-North American area code 905
Elevation: about 200 m (700 ft)

Education
Beeton has one public elementary school (Tecumseth Beeton Elementary School) and one Catholic elementary school (Monsignor J.E Ronan Catholic School).

Railway

Beeton was a stop on the Hamilton and North-Western Railway. The railway split just north of the townsite, at a location then known as Allimil, running northeast through Cookstown to Barrie and northwest through Alliston to Collingwood. The line was later taken over by the Grand Trunk Railway, eventually turning into Canadian National Railways. Canadian Pacific Railway constructed a second line just to the west of town, and the CNR right-of-way was closed in the 1970s. The portion of the CNR railway running from Beeton south to Tottenham is now used for the South Simcoe Railway, a heritage railway.

See also

 List of unincorporated communities in Ontario

References

External links 

Communities in Simcoe County
Populated places established in 1836
1836 establishments in the British Empire